The following lists events that happened during 2006 in Yemen.

Incumbents
President: Ali Abdullah Saleh

Events

February
 February 9 - U.S. forces are searching for the  attacker who escaped from prison last Friday. According to Interpol, an al-Qaeda operative who had been sentenced to death for plotting the bombing of the USS Cole in 2000 escaped with a group of convicts from their prison last week in Sana'a.

September
 September 23 - Ali Abdullah Saleh, in office since 1978, is re-elected as President of Yemen with 77.2% of the votes, prompting allegations of electoral fraud from the Yemeni opposition coalition.

References

 
Years of the 21st century in Yemen
2000s in Yemen
Yemen
Yemen